Centrosomal protein 128kDa is a protein that in humans is encoded by the CEP128 gene.

References

Further reading 

Human proteins
Centrosome